May–Hegglin anomaly (MHA), is a rare genetic disorder of the blood platelets that causes them to be abnormally large.

Presentation
In the leukocytes, the presence of very small rods (around 3 micrometers), or Döhle-like bodies can be seen in the cytoplasm.

Pathogenesis
MHA is believed to be associated with the MYH9 gene. The pathogenesis of the disorder had been unknown until recently, when autosomal dominant mutations in the gene encoding non-muscle myosin heavy chain IIA (MYH9) were identified. Unique cytoplasmic inclusion bodies are aggregates of nonmuscle myosin heavy chain IIA, and are only present in granulocytes. These May-Hegglin inclusions are large, basophilic, cytoplasmic inclusions resembling Döhle bodies in the granulocytes. It is not yet known why inclusion bodies are not present in platelets, monocytes, and lymphocytes, or how giant platelets are formed. MYH9 is also found to be responsible for several related disorders with macrothrombocytopenia and leukocyte inclusions, including Sebastian, Fechtner, and Epstein syndromes, which feature deafness, nephritis, and/or cataract. MHA is also a feature of the Alport syndrome (hereditary nephritis with sensorineural hearing loss).

Diagnosis

Treatment

May-Hegglin Anomaly can be treated by various methods:
 Medication;Tranexamic Acid
 Desmopressin Acetate
 Platelet Transfusion will not work, because the affected platelets will overtake the new platelets.

History
MHA is named for German physician Richard May (January 7, 1863 – 1936) and Swiss physician Robert Hegglin. The disorder was first described by Richard May in 1909 and was subsequently described by Robert Hegglin in 1945.

References

External links 

Coagulopathies
Cytoskeletal defects
Rare diseases